Amada "Amy" Galvez Santos-Ocampo De Francesco  (23 June 1925 – 20 December 2009) was a Philippine pianist and composer.

Biography
Amada Santos-Ocampo was born in Manila, Philippines, of parents Antonino Santos-Ocampo, Sr., and Juanita Galvez of Manila. She graduated with a bachelor's degree from Centro Escolar University in Manila, and a master's degree in music composition from De Pauw University in Indiana. She studied for her PhD in music composition at Indiana University.

Santos-Ocampo took a position in the Penn State University human kinetics programs where she worked for 24 years and composed music for ballet. She was one of the first members of the League of Filipino Composers founded in 1955. Santos-Ocampo died in San Jose, California.

References

1925 births
2009 deaths
20th-century classical composers
Women classical composers
Filipino classical composers
Musicians from Manila
Centro Escolar University alumni
20th-century women composers
Filipino women composers
Indiana University alumni
Filipino expatriates in the United States